Ribbed is the third studio album by the American punk rock band NOFX, released in 1991 through Epitaph Records. It was their last album to feature Steve Kidwiler on guitar; he was replaced by El Hefe. Ribbed is also the last NOFX album produced by Brett Gurewitz, who also produced their first two Epitaph albums. The album sold 8,000 copies upon its release.

In 2018, NOFX released the album Ribbed: Live in a Dive, a recording of a 2012 concert where the band played Ribbed in its entirety.

As of 2021, Ribbed is NOFX's shortest studio album at 25 minutes.

Critical reception
The Encyclopedia of Popular Music called the album "an unblemished collection of genuinely funny songs." Trouser Press wrote that "Mike doesn’t alter his bratty delivery, but the record’s increased use of harmonies would become permanent."

Track listing
All songs by Fat Mike except "Together on the Sand," by Steve Kidwiller.

Personnel
 Fat Mike – vocals, bass
 Eric Melvin – guitar
 Steve Kidwiler – guitar, vocals on "Together on the Sand"
 Erik Sandin (Groggy Nodbeggar) – drums
 Jay Bentley – backing vocals
 Mark Curry – backing vocals
 Dave Smalley - high-pitched crooning vocals on "New Boobs" (not credited) 
 Brett Gurewitz – producer

References

External links
NOFX official website

Ribbed at YouTube (streamed copy where licensed)

NOFX albums
1991 albums
Epitaph Records albums